Motahhari is a Persian name common in Iran. Notable people with the surname include:
 Morteza Motahhari (1919–1979), Iranian politician
 Ali Motahari  (born 1958), Iranian politician

Persian-language surnames